Susan Margulies is an American engineer and assistant director of the U.S. National Science Foundation, heading the Directorate for Engineering. She is also the Georgia Research Alliance Eminent Scholar in Injury Biomechanics and Professor in the Wallace H. Coulter Department of Biomedical Engineering at the Georgia Institute of Technology and Emory University, where she served as chair from 2017 to 2021. She is a world leader in the biomechanics of head injury in infants.

Early life and education 
Margulies grew up in Rochester, Minnesota. She completed her Bachelor's at Princeton University, where she majored in mechanical and aerospace engineering. She graduated summa cum laude in 1982. She spent her summer holidays at Massachusetts Institute of Technology completing research related to biology. She earned her Master's and PhD at University of Pennsylvania in 1987. Her dissertation, Biomechanics of traumatic coma in the primate, considered diffuse axonal injury.

Research 
After completing her PhD, Margulies joined the Mayo Clinic as a postdoctoral researcher working in a pulmonary lab. In 1993 she joined University of Pennsylvania. She was the first woman to be appointed Professor to the Biomedical engineering department at the University of Pennsylvania in 2004. Here she led the Injury Biomechanics lab, focussing on lung injury and head injury. The lung research studied lung function in vivo and in vitro using animal models developed for pulmonary diseases. Her head injury research integrated animal models, computational models, patient data and mechanical properties in order to understand children's traumatic brain injury. She is interested in the injury thresholds within the brain and lung. She launched the Neurointensive Care and Assessment Facility with money from National Institutes of Health. By studying the molecular biology of injured cells, Margulies hopes to develop therapeutic measures for traumatic injury.

In 2015 she joined the advisory board of Astrocyte Pharmaceuticals. In May 2017 she was announced as Chair of the Coulter Department and Eminent Scholar at Emory University and the Georgia Institute of Technology. She has received over $35 million in research funding, published over 350 peer-reviewed scientific articles and 11 book chapters.

In 2020 Margulies was elected to the National Academy of Engineering for elaborating the traumatic injury thresholds of brain and lung in terms of structure-function mechanisms. The same year she was also elected to the National Academy of Medicine for identifying how and why injuries occur in children's brains and lungs through the development and use of novel platform technologies and models, and for translating basic discoveries of three therapies in pre-clinical trials.

Honours and awards 

 1992 Whitaker Foundation Young Investigator
 1997 NSF CAREER Award
 1996 S. Reid Warren Award for Distinguished Teaching
 2009 Ford Motor Company Award for Faculty Advising
 2007 American Society of Mechanical Engineering Award
 2007 Association of Women in Science Elizabeth Bingham Award for the Advancement of Women in Science
 2006 American Institute for Medical and Biological Engineering, Fellow
 2009 American Society of Mechanical Engineers, Fellow
 2009 Biomedical Engineering Society, Fellow
 2015 Distinguished Lecturer, Sackler Institute for Advanced Studies
 2020 National Academy of Engineering, Member
2020 National Academy of Medicine, Member

References 

Living people
20th-century American engineers
21st-century American engineers
American women engineers
American biomedical engineers
People from Rochester, Minnesota
Engineers from Minnesota
Princeton University alumni
University of Pennsylvania alumni
University of Pennsylvania faculty
Georgia Tech faculty
Fellows of the American Institute for Medical and Biological Engineering
Fellows of the American Society of Mechanical Engineers
Fellows of the Biomedical Engineering Society
21st-century women engineers
20th-century women engineers
Year of birth missing (living people)
20th-century American women
American women academics
21st-century American women
Members of the National Academy of Medicine